Qillqata (Aymara qillqaña to write, -ta a suffix to indicate the participle, "written" or "something written",  also spelled Kelkhata) is a  mountain in the Bolivian Andes. It lies in the La Paz Department, Loayza Province, Malla Municipality. Qillqata is situated south-west of Malla. The river Malla Jawira flows along its southern slopes.

References 

Mountains of La Paz Department (Bolivia)